Driftland is a purpose-built race track for drifting inspired by the drift tracks of Japan at the Lochgelly Motorsport Complex, Fife, Scotland.

The facility is the only race track in the UK that is dedicated to drifting. Onsite storage is also available.

Events held at Driftland include the British Drift Championship, the Ultimate Scottish Ford Show, Retro Drift Challenge, and the Scottish Drift Championships.

References

External links 

Motorsport venues in Scotland
Drifting (motorsport)